Enlightenment is the fifth serial of the 20th season of the British science fiction television series Doctor Who, which was originally broadcast in four twice-weekly parts on BBC1 from 1 to 9 March 1983. It was the 127th serial of the series, and was written by Barbara Clegg and directed by Fiona Cumming, making it the first serial to be both written and directed by women.

In the serial, the alien time traveller the Fifth Doctor (Peter Davison) and his companions Tegan Jovanka (Janet Fielding) and Vislor Turlough (Mark Strickson) encounter a group of god-like immortals who are racing historical sailing vessels from Earth through space, crewed by humans they had plucked out of time, in an attempt to win the prize of enlightenment. Turlough is under the control of the Black Guardian (Valentine Dyall), but struggles with the Guardian's orders to kill the Doctor. Enlightenment is the third of three loosely connected serials where the Black Guardian attempts to compel Turlough to kill the Doctor.

The serial's production was beset by problems caused by industrial action taken by electricians at the BBC during filming. It was eventually finished three months behind schedule, but the unavailability of several actors for new filming dates forced the production team to recast their parts at short notice. Enlightenment averaged 6.8 million viewers per episode on its first transmission and received generally positive reviews from critics.

Plot
Following interference from both the White and Black Guardians, the Fifth Doctor materialises the TARDIS in what appears to be the hold of an Edwardian yacht, though the Doctor senses something is amiss. The human crew have no idea how they got there nor where they are, but know they are taking part in a race. The Doctor and his companions, Tegan and Turlough, discover that the yacht and several other historical Earth ships are competing in a solar sail race through the Solar System. The ship's officers reveal themselves to be "Eternals", in contrast to the Doctor and the humans, whom they somewhat dismissively call "Ephemerals". The Eternals live in the "trackless wastes of eternity" and rely on Ephemerals for their thoughts and ideas. This race is being held by the Guardians and the prize is Enlightenment, the wisdom to know everything. The Doctor finds that the Eternals have made his TARDIS vanish, forcing him and his companions to stay until the race's conclusion.

As the race continues, several of the vessels are destroyed by explosions. The Doctor suspects that the crew aboard the Buccaneer, which is a 17th-century pirate ship, is responsible, as it was the closest vessel at the time of destruction. Turlough, while attempting to escape control of the Black Guardian, ends up aboard the Buccaneer, and meets the Eternal Captain Wrack, professing his desire to join her crew and learning she too is working for the Black Guardian. He finds equipment aboard her ship that appears to be the source of the device destroying the other ships and hears the Black Guardian's voice nearby. Later, Wrack offers the Edwardian officers a reception aboard her ship. During the reception, Turlough demonstrates the Wrack's advantage-providing equipment to the Doctor, while Wrack hypnotizes Tegan and implants Tegan's tiara (Tegan and Marriner attend Captain Wrack's reception in full Edwardian costume) with a red crystal. After the reception and continuation of the race, the Doctor sees the Buccaneer nearing the Edwardian ship, determines that the red crystal is used as a focal point of the weapon, and gets rid of the tiara before Wrack can destroy the ship.

Nearing the end of the race, the solar winds dissipate and the Buccaneer pulls ahead of the Edwardian ship. Not wishing to see Wrack win, the Eternals return the TARDIS to the Doctor, allowing him to travel to the Buccaneer. However, he is captured, and Wrack's first mate suggests that the Doctor be thrown overboard. From the Edwardian ship, Tegan and the others watch as two bodies are ejected from the Buccaneer just before it crosses the finish line.

The ships and their human crews are returned to Earth and the Guardians dismiss the other Eternals. It is revealed that the Doctor won the race, with Wrack and her first mate having suffered "an unfortunate accident". The Doctor refuses the prize, but as Turlough helped the Doctor, he is entitled to a portion of the prize. The Black Guardian reminds Turlough of their bargain, and says that he can give up the diamond, or sacrifice the Doctor to gain both Enlightenment and the TARDIS. Turlough hurls the diamond at the Black Guardian, who vanishes in screams and flames. The Doctor points out that Enlightenment was not the diamond, but the choice itself.

Continuity
To commemorate the show's anniversary, every story during Season 20 included the return of an enemy from the Doctor's past. During this trilogy (begun in the serial Mawdryn Undead, and concluding with Enlightenment), the enemy was the Black Guardian, who was last encountered by the fourth incarnation of the Doctor at the conclusion of The Key to Time saga in the 1979 serial The Armageddon Factor. The story also saw the return of the White Guardian, who had also not been seen since 1979.

Production

Conception and writing
After penning a number of radio and TV scripts, including episodes of Crossroads and Waggoner's Walk, Barbara Clegg submitted a story idea to Doctor Who script editor Eric Saward, an acquaintance from the BBC drama department. Interested in writing for the series, Clegg had been inspired when distant relatives had stayed with her and demanded constant entertainment during their visit, basing the character of the Eternals upon them. Initially titled The Enlighteners, her submission involved ships racing through space that, with the addition of the Black Guardian sub-plot, eventually evolved into the story as screened. Saward and series producer John Nathan-Turner liked Clegg's ideas, and they commissioned the script in September 1981. 

The first episode was delivered by Clegg in October and the three following episodes arriving in January 1982. The serial was now scheduled to conclude a three-story trilogy featuring the Black Guardian, and Clegg duly wrote the recurring characters into her scripts. By May 1982 there were problems with a script by Pat Mills, Song of the Space Whale, which had been intended to open the Black Guardian trilogy. Mills' script was eventually dropped and the production team considered moving The Enlighteners forward in the season to replace it, necessitating considerable re-writes. Peter Grimwade was eventually commissioned to write Mawdryn Undead to replace The Song of the Space Whale, and The Enlighteners was confirmed as the fifth serial of the season. 

The first draft of Part One did not contain any of the material concerning the Guardians, and Turlough was a peripheral figure, with the script focussing on the relationship between Marriner and Tegan. With pre-production underway, Saward changed the story title to Enlightenment in September 1982, a title he felt was more enigmatic. Saward also rewrote portions of the script pertaining to the story-arc, particularly the final confrontation scenes at the end of Part Four. Peter Moffatt had been originally scheduled as the serial's director, but following the problems with the Space Whale script he was asked to helm its replacement due to his experience, and so Fiona Cumming was asked to take over Enlightenment.

Once production began it became apparent that Part One and Part Two were under-running so more dialogue was written to fill in the time. It was originally intended that the character of Jackson would not reappear after the second episode, but during filming Saward became concerned that it appeared that he had been executed and so he and Clegg rewrote Part Three to include him. Part Three also looked to be under running so scenes from Part Four were brought forward and the final scenes with the Guardians were extended to compensate.

Casting
Cumming came up with the idea that the Eternals would not blink and cast actors who she believed could provide detached performances. Cumming recalled Peter Sallis had played a similarly detached character in the 1974 BBC drama The Pallisers, and she cast him in the role of Striker. Sallis was present during the rehearsals for the serial but when production was delayed he was unavailable for the new filming dates, being committed to filming Last of the Summer Wine, and was forced to drop out of the production, being replaced by Keith Barron.  Lynda Baron was cast as Captain Wrack, having previously participated in Doctor Who in the 1966 serial The Gunfighters as the voice that sings the "Ballad of the Last Chance Saloon" heard throughout that story. Tony Caunter, who had previously played Thatcher in The Crusade and Morgan in Colony in Space, was given the role of Jackson, with Christopher Brown and David Rhule being cast as Marriner and Wrack's sidekick Mansell respectively. Similarly to Sallis, David Rhule was unavailable for the revised filming dates in January, so singer Leee John replaced him at short notice, despite having no previous acting experience.

Valentine Dyall had originally played the Black Guardian in the 1979 serial The Armageddon Factor, the character's first appearance in the series, and reprised the role for season 20, appearing in Mawdryn Undead, Terminus and Enlightenment. Similarly, Cyril Luckham reprised the role of the White Guardian that he had previously played in the 1979 serial The Ribos Operation.

Design
The interior sets of the boats were not built specifically for the programme, but were pulled together from stock items from various prop warehouses. Cumming had originally hoped to simulate the rocking of the ships by mounting the sets on rollers but the idea was dropped due to costs, with the effect achieved by moving the cameras instead. The photo of Tegan's Aunt Vanessa, one of the items created by Marriner from the contents of her mind, was shot specifically for the filming, requiring Dolore Whiteman (who had played the character in Logopolis) to be contracted for a one-day photoshoot. The models of the boats, used in the racing sequences, were props sourced by visual effects designer Mike Kelt following extensive research at the National Maritime Museum. The ships were mounted on rods for filming, while the oars were battery operated. The model of Davey's ship remained intact, with its explosion being a filmed effect that was edited into the sequence. Kelt was shocked by the dilapidated state of the TARDIS console prop, and was worried about damaging it while filming the explosion from Part One, and asked producer John Nathan-Turner if he could replace it but was told there was no money available.

The anachronistic wetsuits on the Edwardian ship were actually heavy-duty overalls that had been painted black. Janet Fielding struggled with the low-cut ball gown she wore during filming as it threatened to expose her breasts on a number of occasions. The ball gown worn by Baron was made especially for the serial and was the most expensive costume on display. The newspaper found by the Doctor in Part One was a reprint of The Times from September 1901, while the food and drink served during the party scenes was all real.

Filming
The serial began principal filming in early November 1982, with filming divided into two main blocks. The first block was shot on film at Ealing Studios between 3–5 November and consisted of the deck scenes and a number of model shots. Actor Mark Strickson was injured while filming the scene of Turlough throwing himself overboard, when the Kirby wire he was suspended from broke, leaving him only able to walk with difficulty for several weeks. The studio work was scheduled to run from 6 November until mid December and consisted of all the interior scenes and those in the TARDIS. By mid-November however the electricians union the EEPTU, had begun strike action which disrupted the filming of a number of BBC productions including Enlightenment and potentially meaning the final three serials of the season would have to be abandoned. The electricians dispute was settled by December, but it had badly affected the series recording schedule. The crew were able to shoot the following serial The King's Demons on schedule, meaning that there was only one recording block left for the part-completed Enlightenment and Eric Saward's season finale; The Return.  With some filming already completed, and its importance in concluding the Black Guardian story-arc, it was decided that Enlightenment should take precedence and so it had its second production block moved to January 1983, while The Return was abandoned.  Due to the delays, the serial only finished filming around a month before its transmission date, meaning that composer Malcolm Clarke only received the first episode for scoring a week before broadcast, having to rely on musical cues he had recorded weeks earlier without having seen any footage.

Themes and interpretation
Writer Barbara Clegg based the Eternals on a wealthy group of her relatives who, upon visiting her, had demanded constant entertainment, treating other family members almost as "lesser beings". Clegg drew inspiration from the Bible's Book of Genesis, deriving the prize of enlightenment from The Tree of Knowledge within it; also, having read about Solar winds, she decided to use them as the basis of propulsion for space vessels. Clegg highlighted the nature of enlightenment, showing it not to be knowledge, as the Eternals believe, but wisdom, as demonstrated by Turlough's rejection of the Black Guardian.

The episode makes use of a regular science-fiction trope: bored, god-like beings playing with mortals' lives for amusement.  In their book About Time, Lawrence Miles and Tat Wood liken this to a prevalent strand of children's fiction, where magical worlds are held together by the rules of the children who visit them.  Miles and Wood also highlight the political elements of the story, likening the portrayal of the Eternals to the view of the upper classes as "effete parasites feeding off the labour (and in this case the imagination) of the proles."  The Doctor then acts as part of the class struggle, helping the workers gain freedom while the gentry get their comeuppance.

In his essay Love is a Stranger, published in the first volume of the Doctor Who Magazine — Special Edition, David Bailey highlights the central idea that "...the lives of little people are precious, special and worth fighting for... ...the Eternals may have unimaginable power at their fingertips but they lack, and are jealous of, one thing: the ability to live, and die." The hollowness of immortality was a thread that ran through Season 20, with the earlier story Mawdryn Undead showing Mawdryn trapped in an endless cycle of painful regeneration, while in The Five Doctors, Borusa's prize of immortality results in little more than a living death. The horror of eternal life is brought home when the Black Guardian threatens Turlough with immortality as a punishment for failure, something that drives him to try and commit suicide rather than face eternity.

Broadcast
Enlightenment was first broadcast in a twice-weekly slot on BBC One during the first two weeks of March 1983. The story episodes averaged 6.8 million viewers, with the highest viewing figures being 7.3 million for the final episode. The episodes averaged 67.5% on BARB's Appreciation Index, with Part Four once again achieving the highest figures.

Archive
The BBC holds all four episodes on D-3 tape, transferred from the original 2" videotapes.

Reception
Reviewing the story for Doctor Who Magazine's 200 Golden Moments special edition, Jeremy Bentham described it as being epic in scale, suggesting it played to the original strengths of the series; "performance, period set design and claustrophobic mood...". He likens Enlightenment to the work of Stanley Kubrick, saying "...it felt grand, it felt lonely, and yes, it felt epic." On reappraising the story for the same magazine following its release on DVD, Gary Gillatt was equally as effusive, calling it "...one of Doctor Who's finest serials."  He highlights the performance of Keith Barron as Captain Striker as being "a master class of under-stated menace" and "pitch perfect", juxtaposing this with the over-the-top pantomime villainy of Lynda Baron as Captain Wrack, with the two captains balancing each other out perfectly.

Writing for the Radio Times, Mark Braxton was less enamoured of some of the performances, suggesting that Baron and Valentine Dyall turn in 'hammy' interpretations of their characters, while Leee John "...makes heavy weather of the simplest activities: helming the ship seems to require the most bizarre posturing."  He had mixed views on the story as a whole, saying that "Enlightenment has promising components that come together and briefly create a little magic, then vanish again, like ships that pass in the night." DVD Talk's John Sinnott had similarly mixed views on the serial, although conceding that "...While it doesn't all succeed, they give it a good try and more things work than don't."  Sinnott also singled out the performance of Keith Barron for particular praise, along with the relationship between Marriner and Tegan.

In their book About Time, Lawrence Miles and Tat Wood have equally mixed feelings about the serial, praising the setting and the performances of Barron and Brown, and suggesting that it "...carries on the tradition of putting symbols from the world we know into disconcerting environments... ...(it) completes the grand illusion of making the history and the fantasy feel like part of the same continuum."  They are less complimentary about other elements however, citing the conclusion as feeling "rushed and tacked on" with too much emphasis on the Guardians and little on the fates of the Eternals. They also dismiss the reveal of enlightenment as being the nature of Turlough's choice, as coming "perilously close to tweeness" and accuse it of being "cod-mythologic moralising".

Enlightenment was placed in 72nd position in Doctor Who Magazine's Mighty 200 reader survey in 2009, which ranked every Doctor Who serial to that point in order of preference.

Commercial releases

In print

A novelisation of this serial, written by story author Barbara Clegg, was published by Target Books in May 1984, with a cover by Andrew Skilleter, and was numbered 85 in the ongoing range. It was the first Doctor Who novelisation to be penned by a woman. On its publication Doctor Who Magazine was underwhelmed by the book, claiming in their review that "In many ways, it falls into the familiar Terrance Dicks pitfalls, being a straightforward reworking of the script with "said" following all the speeches. For all its faults, Enlightenment remains a good read, simply because of the strength of the story..." The book was repackaged as part of The Sixth Doctor Who Gift Set later in 1984, along with three other Doctor Who novels; The Dominators, Mawdryn Undead and The Five Doctors.

Home media
Enlightenment was released on VHS in February 1993. It was subsequently released on DVD as part of the Black Guardian Trilogy, along with preceding stories Mawdryn Undead and Terminus on 10 August 2009. The second disc of the DVD includes a "Special Edition" version of the story; a movie-style edit featuring new CGI graphics throughout, with a newly recorded introduction by director Fiona Cumming.  Doctor Who Magazine was not enthusiastic about the new edit suggesting, that "...what is special about it is up for debate." The reviewer disparaged the new special effects, stating that "...this is ironic as there are few Doctor Who stories less in need of replacement effects than Enlightenment. The original model work is gorgeous, while this substitute material is crude and unsophisticated in comparison." Alongside the special edition, the DVD contained a number of extra features, including a Making of... documentary and extended interviews with director Fiona Cumming, writer Barbara Clegg and actor Mark Strickson, a documentary on the Guardians plus an excerpt from the Russell Harty Christmas Party TV special featuring Peter Davison. This serial was also released as part of the Doctor Who DVD Files in issue 57 on 9 March 2011.

Notes

References

Bibliography

External links

Reviews

Target novelisation

Fifth Doctor serials
Venus in television
Space pirates
1983 British television episodes